Saskia Cohen-Tanugi (1959 – 20 July 2020) was a Tunisian-born French theatre director.

Filmography

Actress
Le Faucon (1983) as Carmen
Never Say Never Again (1983) as Nicole
Réveillon chez Bob (1984)

Screenwriting
Veraz (1991)
Little Buddha (1993)
Le Maître des éléphants (1995)

Staging
The Merchant of Venice (1983)
Docteur X Hero ou le dernier client du Ritz (1984)
Bastien und Bastienne (1987)

References

1959 births
2020 deaths
20th-century French actresses
21st-century French actresses
French directors
Tunisian emigrants to France
Tunisian Jews
Actors from Tunis